The Garden Village is an area of model village housing built in the early 1900s, in the Summergangs area of Kingston upon Hull, England, for the workers of Reckitt & Sons.

History and description

The company's dividends were limited to 3%.

The estate opened in 1908, its design was influenced by the ideas of the Garden city movement. The design was by architects Percy Runton and William Barry. By 1913, 600 houses had been built in five sizes and with twelve different styles, generally with a short front garden and long back garden, often accessed by a 'ten-foot' alley, a low housing density, built of brick often pebble dashed, (some houses received a white Medusa Portland cement render) with steeply pitched roofs with overhanging eaves, recessed doorways and wood framed windows, privet hedges, and avenued tree planting generalising the design. A second phase of development began in 1923.

Facilities included a shopping centre, club house, a hostel for female workers, as well as several almshouses, several of which are listed buildings. A substantial number of the ordinary housing stock are now also listed buildings.

During the Hull Blitz the area was badly damaged by bombing, possibly due to its proximity to Reckitt & Sons' Dansom Lane works.

In 1950 the Garden Village company was disbanded; some houses were sold to tenants, the entire estate was bought by the Bradford Property Trust, the open spaces known as 'The Oval' and 'The Playground' were transferred to the Hull City Council for a nominal fee. The area became a designated conservation area in 1970.

Church of St Columba

A temporary church dedicated to St Columba had been built in 1914, on Laburnum Avenue also by the architects Runton and Barry, a permanent building was constructed and opened in 1929, but was destroyed during the Second World War by bombing. A replacement was constructed using some elements of the old structure. The new church became the parish church for the ecclesiastical parish of Drypool in 1961.

See also
List of areas in Kingston upon Hull

References

Sources

Maps

External links

Model villages
Garden suburbs
Wards and districts of Kingston upon Hull
Geographic histories of Kingston upon Hull
Reckitt
Housing estates in Kingston upon Hull